Gianfranco Zilioli (born 5 March 1990) is an Italian former professional racing cyclist.

Major results
Source:

2010
 9th Overall Giro della Valle d'Aosta
 9th Trofeo Gianfranco Bianchin
2011
 6th Giro del Belvedere
 10th Overall Giro della Valle d'Aosta
 2012
 1st GP Capodarco
 2nd Gran Premio di Poggiana
 5th Overall Giro della Valle d'Aosta
 6th Giro del Medio Brenta
 6th Gran Premio Palio del Recioto
 2013
 1st Gran Premio Industria e Commercio di Prato
 3rd GP Capodarco
 3rd Piccolo Giro di Lombardia
 6th Overall Settimana Ciclistica Lombarda
 7th Coppa della Pace
 2014
 6th Overall Sibiu Cycling Tour
 7th Giro dell'Emilia
 7th GP Industria & Artigianato di Larciano
 8th Overall Tour de Langkawi
 10th Giro di Toscana
2015
 4th Road race, National Road Championships
 6th Coppa Bernocchi

Grand Tour general classification results timeline

References

External links
 

1990 births
Living people
Italian male cyclists
People from Clusone
Cyclists from the Province of Bergamo